NGFS may refer to:
Naval gunfire support
New Garden Friends School
Network for Greening the Financial System